The Lancashire Police and Crime Commissioner is the police and crime commissioner, an elected official tasked with setting out the way crime is tackled by Lancashire Police in the English County of Lancashire. The post was created in November 2012, following an election held on 15 November 2012, and replaced the Lancashire Police Authority.  Andrew Snowden (Conservative) was elected in 2021, succeeding    Clive Grunshaw (Labour) who had held the post since 2012.

List of Lancashire  Police and Crime Commissioners

Election results

References

Police and crime commissioners in England